"You Never Know" is a song recorded by Japanese-American singer-songwriter Ai featuring Taiwanese hip hop group MJ116 (also known as 頑童MJ116), released on August 9, 2019, by EMI Records as the second single from Ai's extended play, It's All Me, Vol. 1.

Background and release 
Celebrating her twenty year anniversary in the music industry, Ai traveled to her hometown, Los Angeles, California to record new material. Looking to collaborate with various artists around the world, Ai discovered MJ116, a hip hop group based in Taiwan. After talking to the group via email and Line, Ai traveled to Taiwan to record a song. Members of MJ116 were nervous at first to record with Ai when they first received a demo of the song. Prior to meeting in-person, the group received affirmations from Ai, which built up their confidence to record with her.

In 2020, "You Never Know" was revealed to be included on Ai's extended play, It's All Me, Vol. 1.

Live performances 
Ai performed the song with MJ116 at the 2019 Summer Sonic Fest.

Track listing 
Digital download and streaming

 "You Never Know"  — 4:36

Credits and personnel 
Credits adapted from Tidal.

 Ai Uemura – vocals, songwriter, producer
 MJ116 – featured artist
 Vava – producer, composer
 Mu Yuan Lin  – songwriter, vocals
 Wen Jie Zhou  – songwriter, vocals
 Yu Rong Chen  – songwriter, vocals

Release history

References 
2019 singles
2019 songs
Ai (singer) songs
Songs written by Ai (singer)
EMI Records singles
Universal Music Japan singles
Mandopop songs
Song recordings produced by Ai (singer)